Leyswood (or Leys Wood or Leyes Wood) is an architecturally notable house in Groombridge, East Sussex, that was designed by Richard Norman Shaw, and completed in 1868. It was a large mansion around a courtyard, complete with mock battlements, towers, half-timbered upper facades and tall chimneys – all features quite readily associated with Tudor architecture; in Shaw's hands, this less fantastical style achieved immediate maturity.

It was substantially reduced in size in 1955 resulting in a significant change in appearance.

References

External links 

https://www.architecture.com/image-library/ribapix/image-information/poster/leyswood-groombridge-east-sussex/posterid/RIBA102143.html
http://www.rightmove.co.uk/property-for-sale/property-40061052.html

Richard Norman Shaw buildings
Buildings and structures completed in 1868
Grade II listed houses
Grade II listed buildings in East Sussex